Magnetic North is the fourth full-length album released by the hardcore band Hopesfall. Josh Brigham, one of the guitarists and the only founding member remaining during the recording of the album, has said: "Our music has always been spacey and heavy, and we use those roots, combined with our love of grunge-era Smashing Pumpkins, Dinosaur Jr., HUM, and Pixies, we add some bigger, heavier riffs.

"We all admire bands that can morph and change with each album, and that is what we try to do. Expect change and progression, in both songwriting and overall style, on the new album."

During the period before this album's release, the band released a new song from the album on their MySpace page each week for the ten weeks prior to the release date.

"Bird Flu" was previously released on the compilation album Trustkill Takeover Vol. 2.

In February 2017, the album was released as a 2-LP vinyl set through Equal Vision Records, and included "Saskatchewan" and an untitled demo as bonus tracks.

Track listing

Unreleased tracks 
The track "Saskatchewan" was originally intended for inclusion on Magnetic North, following the album's title track, but was cut from all releases without the band consenting. When the band found out the CDs and artwork had already been manufactured.
Other bonus tracks may have been planned but were not included.

"We're working on some interesting things still, with bonus tracks and such for the releases in Europe and Japan.  We're talking about some re-mixes too. We scrapped a couple of songs on the record, so maybe we'll work on those, too. Be on the lookout."

Charts

Personnel 
Hopesfall
Jay Forrest – vocals
Josh Brigham – guitar
Dustin Nadler – guitar
Mike Tyson – bass
Jason Trabue – drums

Production
Mike Watts – production, mixing, engineering
Rich Liegey – additional engineering, backing vocals on track 2
Troy Glessner – mastering
Chandler Owen – art direction

References 

Hopesfall albums
2007 albums
Trustkill Records albums
Equal Vision Records albums